Saxmundham railway station is on the East Suffolk Line in the east of England, serving the town of Saxmundham, Suffolk. Its three-letter station code is SAX.

It is managed by Abellio Greater Anglia, which operates all trains serving the station.

The signalling centre for the line is located in the signal cabin on the Lowestoft-bound platform, which formerly served as the control centre while the line was signalled using the Radio Electronic Token Block (RETB) system.

History 
The station building suffered a devastating fire on 12 February 2018. Following the fire, the station was renovated with a new waiting room, refurbished platform canopies, a new shelter and seating on platform 2, and an enlarged car park. A ceremony marking the completion of the refurbishment took place on 27 September 2021.

Services
 the typical Monday-Saturday off-peak service at Saxmundham is as follows:

On Sundays frequency reduces to one train every two hours in each direction. Trains direct to and from London Liverpool Street were withdrawn in 2010.

One service terminates at Saxmundham every weekday morning: the 06:20 from Ipswich, which includes a stop at Westerfield.

References

External links

Railway stations in Suffolk
DfT Category F1 stations
Former Great Eastern Railway stations
Greater Anglia franchise railway stations
Railway stations in Great Britain opened in 1859
Saxmundham